Torii Hunter Baseball Complex is a baseball venue in Pine Bluff, Arkansas, United States. It is home to the Arkansas–Pine Bluff Golden Lions baseball team of the NCAA Division I Southwestern Athletic Conference. The facility has a capacity of 1,000 spectators and is named for Torii Hunter, the head benefactor and hometown supporter. On August 31, 2018, the University broke ground on the completion of the concessions pavilion and press box.

History 
On August 31, 2018, the University broke ground on a press box and concessions pavilion, aided by another $250,000 donation from Hunter and Simmons Bank.

Features 
The field's features include an grass playing surface, a press box, an electronic scoreboard, dugouts, a brick backstop, restrooms, and concessions.  The press box, restrooms and concessions were finished prior to the start of the 2019 season.

See also 
 List of NCAA Division I baseball venues

References 

College baseball venues in the United States
Baseball venues in Arkansas
Arkansas–Pine Bluff Golden Lions baseball